(born 9 May 1979) is a former professional tennis player from the Netherlands.  Coined as ‘Mad Melle’ by the Dutch press, due to his ethics on court, was part of a scandalous doping process in a Mauritius ATP Challenger in 2004. He  peaked his career as ATP singles world ranking as nr. 100 by June, 2006, maintaining it for a month.

Career

Van Gemerden, coined as ‘Mad Melle’ by the Dutch press, due to his ethics on court; was part of a scandalous cannabis doping during a Mauritius Challenger in 2004. He was able to reach ATP singles world ranking nr. 100 by June, 2006, maintaining it for only a month. He made one time appearances in all Grand Slams and was also briefly a Davis Cup representative member of the Netherlands team.

He marked the beginning of his career in 1997, with the Dutch Junior Champion under 18, indoor and outdoor titles. In 1998–1999 he comprised the Jong Oranje - a prized contract presented by the KNLTB to Netherlands' most proficient junior players. During a Mauritius Challenger  tournament, late in December 2004, he was tested positive for a metabolite of cannabis or tetrahydrocannabinol (THC).  Whilst the ATP tribunal accepted Van Gemerden had committed a doping offense under the rules of the Tennis Anti-Doping Program with Exceptional Circumstances; the use of cannabis, in that case, was determined to not be for performance enhancing reasons. It was ruled he forfeit US$2,950 in prize money and all ranking points won at the Mauritius Challenger. Although he was eligible to return to competition immediately, Van Gemerden voluntarily sat out. Coming after, in July 2005, he defeated  Kristof Vliegen, triumphing the Scheveningen Challenger.

Van Gemerden played for the Netherlands Davis Cup team from 2004 to 2006. He took on Slovakia in the 2005 World Group quarter-finals and appeared both in the doubles, with Paul Haarhuis, and in the singles against Michal Mertiňák. He lost both of those matches and was also unable to register a win in the two other Davis Cup matches of his career, singles rubbers against Russians Nikolay Davydenko and Dmitry Tursunov in 2006.

The Dutch tennis player begin his appearance at Grand Slams starting with the 2005 Australian Open, where he was drawn up against 31st seed Juan Carlos Ferrero, who won the match in four sets. The same year, he was a quarter-finalist in the 2005 Dutch Open, beating world number 46 Christophe Rochus en route. The following year, in 2006, he played in both the French Open and Wimbledon Championships. In France he lost in the opening round to Juan Mónaco but he made the second round of Wimbledon, beating Josh Goodall, before being eliminated from the tournament by Mardy Fish.  Van Gemerden made it to US OPEN by 2008, being defeated by Jean-Yves Aubone at the first round.    

Van Gemerden carried as a hitting partner, from 2008 to 2010 to  Ana Ivanovic and Fernando Verdasco, coached at different times by Sven Groeneveld; and Sorana Cîrstea, coached by Rodrigo Nascimento. Then, turned into professional tennis coach to Thiemo de Bakker,from 2014 until 2015; and Christian Lerby, for 5 months, in 2018. Lastly, from January 2019 until he was fired on February 2020, children for the KNLTB, as a traveling freelance coach.

ATP Challenger and ITF Futures Finals

Singles: 9 (4–5)

Doubles: 17 (6–11)

References

External links
 
 

1979 births
Living people
Dutch male tennis players
Doping cases in tennis
Dutch sportspeople in doping cases
Tennis players from Amsterdam